Aaron James Teahan Webber (born June 20, 1989, in Chester Basin, Nova Scotia, Canada) is a Canadian stage and screen actor. His best known role is as Emerson in the 2005 film Whole New Thing. Other roles include A Stone's Throw.

Early life
Webber was born in Chester Basin, Nova Scotia, Canada, and started acting in community theatre at age six. He trained at the Chester Summer Theatre Performance School between ages 11 and 16.

Career
Prior to his first feature film, Webber played numerous roles in several Chester Playhouse productions, including Mortimer in The Fantasticks and the title roles in both Peter Pan and Charlie and the Chocolate Factory. While playing Gollum in The Hobbit, Webber grabbed the attention of producer Camelia Frieberg, and was asked to audition for the lead role of Emerson in Whole New Thing.

Webber was the first to audition for Whole New Thing and director Amnon Buchbinder and co-writer Daniel MacIvor cast him immediately, cutting short an anticipated countrywide search for the all-important role of Emerson. After winning a 2005 Atlantic Canada Award for Outstanding Performance by an Actor, Webber went on to play the supporting role of Thomas in Frieberg's directorial début, A Stone's Throw. Following that he once again played the lead for Buchbinder in an experimental short called The Traveling Medicine Show.

Personal life
Webber currently lives in Toronto, Ontario. He is friends with actress Molly Dunsworth He is a long time member and former political operative of the New Democratic Party.

Selected filmography
{| class="wikitable"
! Year
! Film
! Role
! Notes
|-
| 2013
| Sex & Violence (TV series)
| Toby
| Lead
|-
| 2012
| Epiphany
| Daniel
| Lead
|-
| 2012
| Call Me Fitz
| Nerdy Man
| One episode
|- 
| 2011
| The Factory Block
| Max 
| Lead (short film, co-starred with Molly Dunsworth)
|-
| 2009
| The Last New Year
| Sebastian 
| Principal
|-
| 2008
| Travelling Medicine Show: 1. Creation
| Max
| Lead
|-
| 2006
| A Stone's Throw
| Thomas
| Principal
|-
| 2005
| Whole New Thing
| Emerson
| Lead, Atlantic Canadian Award, Outstanding Performance by an Actor - Male (shared with "Daniel MacIvor)
|-
| 2004
| A Summer Fling| Jimmy
| Lead
|}

Awards and nominations
 Atlantic Film Festival Won the Atlantic Canadian Award, Category: Outstanding Performance by an Actor - Male for Whole New Thing'' (2005)

See also

 List of former child actors from Canada

References

External links

Living people
1989 births
Canadian male child actors